Dimitrios Papaioannou (born 4 October 2001) is a Greek professional footballer who plays as a midfielder for Super League 2 club Doxa Drama.

References

2001 births
Living people
Greek footballers
Super League Greece 2 players
Doxa Drama F.C. players
Association football midfielders